Robert Warzycha (born 20 August 1963) is a Polish former professional association football player.

Warzycha had a long career in Europe, playing for teams in Poland, Hungary and England with Everton in the Premier League. He won two Polish Ekstraklasa titles and a Polish Super Cup with Górnik Zabrze. Warzycha was also a regular member of the Poland national football team throughout the late 1980s and early 1990s, amassing 47 caps.

He moved to the United States in 1996 and subsequently spent seven seasons in Major League Soccer with Columbus Crew. He later served as a coach for the team, serving as head coach for five seasons.

Club career
After beginning his career in his native Poland, Warzycha moved to England in March 1991 when Howard Kendall signed him for Everton in a £500,000 deal. He started well, scoring twice in his first eight games for Everton, and missing just five league games in the 1991–92.

He was one of only thirteen players not from the British Isles to play on the opening weekend of the FA Premier League along with Jan Stejskal, Peter Schmeichel, Andrei Kanchelskis, Roland Nilsson, Eric Cantona, Hans Segers, John Jensen, Anders Limpar, Gunnar Halle, Craig Forrest, Michel Vonk and Ronnie Rosenthal and was also the first player from mainland Europe to score in the Premier League. His goal was the only one scored by a Polish player in the competition until Marcin Wasilewski scored in January 2015, 22 years later.

His goal against Manchester United in a 3–0 win at Old Trafford proved to be his last goal for Everton. He fell out of favour later that season and played just seven times in the 1993–94 season, and was clearly not part of new manager Mike Walker's plans. He went to Hungary at the end of the season to sign for Pécsi Mecsek. A year later, he was sold to Kispest Honvéd FC of Hungary.

In 1996, he joined Columbus Crew for the Major League Soccer's inaugural year. Warzycha became a staple in the lineup for five seasons, and then a bit player in his final two, as he battled injuries. He retired as the Crew's all-time assist leader with 61 and also scored 19 goals in MLS league play. During his playing days in Columbus, Warzycha was known as "The Polish Rifle," in part because of his accuracy from free kicks. On 25 March 2000 Warzycha scored the first-ever regular-season "Golden Goal" in Major League Soccer history to defeat the San Jose Earthquakes 2–1. He played two more years for Columbus Crew before retiring from playing in 2002 at the age of 39.

International career
For Poland, Warzycha was capped 47 times, scoring seven goals between 1987 and 1993.

Managerial career
After retiring as a player, he became an assistant coach with the Crew. After Greg Andrulis was fired in July 2005, Warzycha assumed interim head coaching duty. He went back to assisting after Sigi Schmid was hired for the full-time job.

After spending several years as Schmid's assistant, Warzycha was promoted to the head coach position at Columbus Crew for the 2009 MLS season, in which he coached the team to the Supporter Shield, awarded for the most points during the regular season. Warzycha signed a multi-year contract extension with Columbus on 1 September 2011 that kept him under contract through the 2013 season. He was released from his contract early, on 2 September 2013.

Personal life
Robert is the father of professional soccer player Konrad Warzycha, who played for Columbus Crew under his father.

Honours

Columbus Crew
Lamar Hunt U.S. Open Cup (1): 2002
 MLS Cup (1): 2008 (assistant coach)
 MLS Supporters Shield (2): 2008 (assistant coach), 2009 (head coach)

Górnik Zabrze
Ekstraklasa (2): 1987, 1988
Polish SuperCup (1): 1988

Honvéd
Hungarian Cup (1): 1996

References

1963 births
Living people
Polish footballers
Polish football managers
Górnik Zabrze players
Everton F.C. players
Premier League players
Columbus Crew players
Columbus Crew coaches
Poland international footballers
Polish expatriate footballers
People from Pajęczno County
Ekstraklasa players
Expatriate footballers in England
Expatriate soccer managers in the United States
Major League Soccer players
Major League Soccer All-Stars
Sportspeople from Łódź Voivodeship
Columbus Crew non-playing staff
Górnik Zabrze managers
Major League Soccer coaches
Association football wingers
Polish expatriate sportspeople in England
Polish expatriate sportspeople in the United States
Polish expatriate football managers